D series may refer to:

Devices
SM-65D Atlas "Atlas D" ICBM
Nikon digital single lens reflex cameras

Media
QI (D series), the fourth series of the BBC TV quiz show QI

Vehicles
Allis-Chalmers D Series, tractors
Bedford D series, trucks
Chevrolet Series D, trucks
Dodge D series, pickup trucks
Ford D series, trucks
Group D Production Sports Cars, CAMS class of race car
Honda D engine
International Harvester light & medium duty trucks of the D Series - 1930s and International Harvester Light Line pickup, 1969–1975
MCI D-Series motorcoaches built by Motor Coach Industries (MCI)
SJ D, locomotives used by Statens Järnvägar (SJ) of Sweden
Volkswagen Group D platform, Audi, Bentley, and Volkswagen chassis configuration
D-series trains, the designation for high-speed long-distance trains in China less fast than the G-series (see Passenger rail transport in  China#Classes)

Other
 Tool steel D series, high carbon-chromium

See also
 C series (disambiguation)
 E series (disambiguation)